The Municipal Corporation of Gurugram is the civic body governing Indian city of Gurgaon. Municipal Corporation mechanism in India was introduced during British Rule with formation of municipal corporation in Madras (Chennai) in 1688, later followed by municipal corporations in Bombay (Mumbai) and Calcutta (Kolkata) by 1762. Gurgaon Municipal Corporation is headed by Mayor of city and governed by Commissioner.

History and administration 

The Municipal Corporation of Gurugram was formed in year 2008. The Corporation is headed by mayor Madhu Azad and governed by Municipal Commissioner Mukesh Kumar Ahuja.
Gurgaon Municipal Corporation has 35 wards and each ward is headed by councillor for which elections are held every 5 years. In Gurgaon Municipal Corporation elections held in year 2017, Independent candidates won 21 seats, BJP had won 13 seats and the principal opposition party of Indian National Lok Dal (INLD) managed one seat.

Municipal Corporation of Gurugram has four zones.

Powers and functions 

Municipal Corporation of Gurugram has following departments for the summarised functions-

 Accounts and Pension - Senior accounts officer heads the department which handles preparation of budget for city, maintaining corporation account books, accounting of expenditure bills and pension cases of its employees.
 Administration - Joint Commissioner heads the department which handles regulating and monitoring that principles of corporation are followed, handling corporation employees cases, managing RTI applications, handling the procurement issues of corporations and implementing laws made by corporations and other internal issues.
 Engineering - Superintendent Engineer or Executive Engineer, heads the department which handles accounting for financial resources from Government of India, Government of Haryana, and other organisations for improving infrastructure and infrastructure related works in city.
 Fire - Handling issues relating to fire and ensuring that the City's structures follow Fire safety measures.
 Audit - Department lays down various guidelines and controls while incurring expenditure for the corporation.
 Health and Sanitation - Chief Sanitation Officer heads the department which handles issues relating to cleaning of streets, Garbage disposal, solid waste management and other sanitation issues.
 Information Technology - Manager - Information Technology heads the department which handles primary functions of maintaining and operating corporation website and providing Information Technology related training to corporation employees along with maintenance of various data in digital mode.
 Tax - Tax Officer heads the department which handles  functions relating to imposing and collection of vehicle tax, property tax, development tax, house tax, fire tax.
 Land and License -  Land Officer heads the department which handles the main purpose of regularizing activities relating to advertising, granting license relating to installation of mobile phone towers in the city, events relating to sale and purchase of land, collection of rent from various sources among others.
 Town Planning and Building - Chief Town Planner heads the department which handles issues relating to town and urban planning, monitoring the land use and construction, issuing Government approvals for purpose like commercial, industrial, residential and any others and regularising the unauthorized settlements which are major functions with department.
 Legal - District Attorney heads the department which majorly deals with legal issues relating to corporation.

Important developments 

 Municipal Corporation of Gurugram passed resolution for closure of meat shops every Tuesday's of the week.

 Municipal Corporation of Gurugram in July 2020 has issued new guidelines for domestic helps to stop spread of COVID pandemic.

 Municipal Corporation of Gurugram in September 2018 had sealed a mosque for not following its guidelines.

See also 
 
 List of municipal corporations in India

References

External links 
 Official Website

2018 establishments in India
Government of Haryana